The German Democratic Union (DDU) was a left-wing political party. The party was only active in Saarland. The DDU was founded in 1955.

Defunct regional parties in Germany
Political parties in Saar
1955 establishments in Saar
Political parties established in 1955
1961 disestablishments in Germany
Political parties disestablished in 1961